Ngioro  is a village in the commune of Bassila in the Donga Department of western Benin.

External links
Satellite map at Maplandia

Populated places in the Donga Department
Commune of Bassila